Zhou Wenyuan (born July 1940) is a lieutenant general in the People's Liberation Army of China.

He was an alternate member of the 13th Central Committee of the Chinese Communist Party and a member of the 14th Central Committee of the Chinese Communist Party. He was a member of the 10th National Committee of the Chinese People's Political Consultative Conference.

Biography
Zhou was born in Tianjin, in July 1940 and graduated from Hebei Normal College of Politics and the PLA Political College. He enlisted in the People's Liberation Army (PLA) in July 1961, and joined the Chinese Communist Party (CCP) in April 1963. He served in the Shenyang Military Region for a long time. He was director of Political Department of the 23rd Group Army in 1983 and one year later became director of the Political Department of Dalian Army School. In March 1985, he was appointed deputy head of the People's Liberation Army General Political Department, in addition to serving as member of the Central Political and Legal Affairs Commission since March 1990. In November 1992, he was made deputy political commissar of the Shenyang Military Region, and served until April 1999. 

He was promoted to the rank of major general (shaojiang) in September 1988 and lieutenant general (zhongjiang) in July 1990.

References

1940 births
Living people
People's Liberation Army generals from Tianjin
People's Republic of China politicians from Tianjin
Chinese Communist Party politicians from Tianjin
Alternate members of the 13th Central Committee of the Chinese Communist Party
Members of the 14th Central Committee of the Chinese Communist Party
Members of the 10th Chinese People's Political Consultative Conference